John Bryden may refer to:

 John H. Bryden (born 1943), Canadian Member of Parliament
 John G. Bryden (born 1937), Canadian Senator
 John Bryden (MLA) (1833–1915), British Columbia MLA
 John Bryden (curler) (1927–2012), Scottish curler